Phoebe McWilliams (born 31 August 1985) is an Australian rules footballer playing for  in the AFL Women's competition. 

She was signed as a priority player before the 2016 AFL Women's draft. She made her debut against  at Thebarton Oval in round one of the 2017 season. McWilliams played every match in her debut season to finish with seven games, and was Greater Western Sydney's top goal-kicker with seven goals.

Greater Western Sydney signed McWilliams for the 2018 season during the trade period in May 2017.

In May 2018, McWilliams accepted an offer from expansion club Geelong to play with the club in the 2019 season.

In June 2022, McWilliams was traded by Geelong to Carlton ahead of the seventh season of the AFL Women’s competition.

Statistics
 Statistics are correct to the end of the 2022 season.

|-
! scope="row" style="text-align:center" | 2017
| style="text-align:center;"|
| 3 || 7 || 7 || 1 || 25 || 17 || 42 || 13 || 9 || 1.0 || 0.1 || 3.6 || 2.4 || 6.0 || 1.9 || 1.3 || 0
|- 
! scope="row" style="text-align:center" | 2018
| style="text-align:center;"|
| 3 || 7 || 7 || 3 || 31 || 23 || 54 || 16 || 16 || 1.0 || 0.4 || 4.4 || 3.3 || 7.7 || 2.3 || 2.3 || 2
|-
! scope="row" style="text-align:center" | 2019
| style="text-align:center;"|
| 23 || 6 || 3 || 4 || 27 || 9 || 36 || 19 || 13 || 0.5 || 0.7 || 4.5 || 1.5 || 6.0 || 3.2 || 2.2 || 1
|- 
! scope="row" style="text-align:center" | 2020
| style="text-align:center;"|
| 23 || 6 || 4 || 1 || 30 || 25 || 55 || 16 || 11 || 0.7 || 0.2 || 5.0 || 4.2 || 9.2 || 2.7 || 1.8 || 0
|-
! scope="row" style="text-align:center" | 2021
| style="text-align:center;"|
| 23 || 9 || 4 || 7 || 54 || 24 || 78 || 30 || 16 || 0.4 || 0.8 || 6.0 || 2.7 || 8.7 || 3.3 || 1.7 || 0
|-
! scope="row" style="text-align:center" | 2022
| style="text-align:center;"|
| 23 || 10 || 10 || 3 || 39 || 21 || 60 || 23 || 18 || 1.0 || 0.3 || 3.9 || 2.1 || 6.0 || 2.3 || 1.8 ||
|- 
|- class=sortbottom
! colspan=3 | Career
! 45 !! 35 !! 19 !! 206 !! 119 !! 325 !! 117 !! 83 !! 0.8 !! 0.4 !! 4.6 !! 2.6 !! 7.2 !! 2.6 !! 1.8 !!  
|}

Personal life
Prior to her AFLW career, McWilliams was communications co-ordinator for the Melbourne Cricket Club. To allow more time to concentrate on her football career, McWilliams became a freelance journalist.

References

External links 

 

1985 births
Living people
Greater Western Sydney Giants (AFLW) players
Australian rules footballers from Victoria (Australia)
Australian women journalists
Victorian Women's Football League players